The Caples River is a river flowing into the Greenstone River in New Zealand. It flows alongside part of the Caples Track.

See also
List of rivers of New Zealand
Greenstone and Caples Tracks

References
Land Information New Zealand - Search for Place Names

Rivers of Otago
Rivers of New Zealand